Thirst (Spanish: La sed) aka Hijo de Hombre, aka Choferes del Chaco is a 1960 Argentine-Spanish war film directed by Lucas Demare. It is set during the Chaco War (1932–35) between Bolivia and Paraguay, sometimes known as the "War of the Thirst". The script is based on a chapter of Augusto Roa Bastos novel Hijo de Hombre. It was made as a co-production between Argentina Sono Film and the Spanish company Suevia Films.

Cast
 Vicente Ariño
 Susy Castell
 Lucas Demare 
 Carlos Dorrego
 Carlos Estrada
 Dora Ferreiro
 Francisco Rabal
 Manuel Rosón
 José María Salort
 Sergio Vandes
 Jorge Villalba 
 Olga Zubarry

References

Bibliography 
 Helene C. Weldt-Basson. Postmodernism's Role in Latin American Literature: The Life and Work of Augusto Roa Bastos. Springer, 2010.

External links 
 

1960 films
1960s Spanish-language films
Films directed by Lucas Demare
Films set in the 1930s
Films set in Paraguay
Chaco War films
Spanish war films
Argentine war films
1960s war films
1960s Argentine films